Beatriz Guadalupe Grande López (born 23 December 1955) is a Mexican politician from the National Action Party. From 2000 to 2003 she served as Deputy of the LVIII Legislature of the Mexican Congress representing San Luis Potosí.

References

1955 births
Living people
People from San Luis Potosí
Women members of the Chamber of Deputies (Mexico)
National Action Party (Mexico) politicians
21st-century Mexican politicians
21st-century Mexican women politicians
Deputies of the LVIII Legislature of Mexico
Members of the Chamber of Deputies (Mexico) for San Luis Potosí